The 2023 Delaware Fightin' Blue Hens football team will represent the University of Delaware as a member of the Colonial Athletic Association (CAA) during the 2023 NCAA Division I FCS football season. They are led by second-year head coach Ryan Carty and play their home games at Delaware Stadium in Newark, Delaware.

Previous season

The Fightin' Blue Hens finished the 2022 season with an overall record of 8–5 and a mark of 4–4 in conference play to place in a tie for sixth in the CAA. They lost 42–6 to South Dakota State in the NCAA Division I Second Round.

Schedule

References

Delaware
Delaware Fightin' Blue Hens football seasons
Delaware Fightin' Blue Hens football